Antonio Nava Castillo (September 9, 1905 – March 28, 1983) was a Mexican polo player who competed in the 1936 Summer Olympics. Born in Ixcaquixtla, Puebla, he was part of the Mexican polo team, which won the bronze medal. He played all three matches in the tournament. Afterwards Nava entered politics and, from 1965 to 1966, he was the Governor of Puebla.

External links
Antonio Nava's profile at databaseOlympics
Equipo nacional de Polo - Medallistas de bronce en Berlín 1936 
XI Juegos Olimpicos Berlin 1936 - Bronce | Equipo de Polo 
Antonio Nava's profile at Sports Reference.com

1905 births
1983 deaths
Mexican polo players
Olympic bronze medalists for Mexico
Olympic polo players of Mexico
Polo players at the 1936 Summer Olympics
Sportspeople from Puebla

Medalists at the 1936 Summer Olympics
Olympic medalists in polo